The Kilchis River is a stream, about  long, near the coast of northwest Oregon in the United States.

The Kilchis River begins at the confluence of its North Fork and South Fork in northern Tillamook County in the Tillamook State Forest northeast of Bay City. It is one of five rivers—the Tillamook, the Trask, the Wilson, the Kilchis, and the Miami—that flow into the bay.

The river has good runs of steelhead and fall Chinook salmon. Because much of the land along the lower stretches is private, fishing is often done by drift boat launched from boat ramps at Kilchis County Park, County Park, and Mapes Creek. Anglers may also fish from stream banks on public land in the Tillamook State Forest.

The Kilchis River was named for the 19th century Tillamook leader Chief Kilchis, whose Tillamook name was [gə́lšəs] or [gə́lčəs].

Course
Starting at the confluence of the North Fork Kilchis River and the South Fork Kilchis River, the river flows generally southwest through the Tillamook State Forest near Kilchis River Road. Shortly thereafter, School Creek and Washout Creek enters from the right and Little South Fork Kilchis River from the left. Below this, the river receives Clear Creek from the left at about river mile (RM) 6 or river kilometer (RK) 9.7. Thereafter, Myrtle Creek and Murphy Creek enter from the right, and the river passes under U.S. Route 101 before entering Tillamook Bay near Idaville.

Reserve
The largest Native American village on the North Oregon Coast was located here as was the home of the first white settler, Joe Champion, who arrived in 1851.

See also
List of rivers of Oregon

References

External links
Tillamook Estuaries Partnership
Tillamook County Pioneer Museum

Rivers of Oregon
Rivers of Tillamook County, Oregon